"The Dinner Party" is the 77th episode of NBC sitcom Seinfeld. This is the 13th episode of the fifth season, and first aired on February 3, 1994. The episode follows the cast's struggles to get to a dinner party with the obligatory gifts of cake and a bottle of wine.

Plot 
Jerry, Elaine, George, and Kramer prepare to attend a dinner party. Elaine feels they must bring wine and cake. George, who is sporting a large Gore-Tex coat due to the cold weather outside, finds this social obligation illogical.

Jerry and Elaine stop at Royal Bakery to purchase a chocolate babka while Kramer and George go to buy wine. Jerry and Elaine forget to take a number at the counter. As a result, David and Barbara Benedict, a couple on their way to the same dinner party, get ahead of them in line and purchase the last chocolate babka. Jerry and Elaine resort to purchasing a cinnamon babka, which Elaine considers a "lesser babka". They find that the babka has a hair on it, and are forced to wait in line again to exchange it. While they wait, Jerry eats a black and white cookie, which he extols as a metaphor for racial harmony. They have to wait for Kramer and George to pick them up. The cookie causes Jerry to end the non-vomit streak he has held since June 29, 1980.

George and Kramer have only a US$100 bill for money, which the wine shop owner refuses to change. They go to a newsstand to break the bill. The attendant insists on their buying multiple items (gum, a newspaper, a Clark Bar, and an issue of Penthouse Forum) in order to make it worth his while to break the bill. After buying the wine, they find that their car is blocked in because someone has double parked. They are forced to wait for the driver to come back before they can pick up Jerry and Elaine. Disgusted, George likens double parkers to dictators.

Because of the cold weather, Kramer insists on going back inside the liquor store, where they are soon evicted. George's coat accidentally knocks down some bottles of wine and he has to surrender the coat to pay for them. Outside, it turns out the double parker is a man who looks like Saddam Hussein but has a British accent. George, Kramer, Jerry, and Elaine finally arrive at the party, where they give the hostess the babka and the wine at the door and immediately leave.

Production 
The Saddam Hussein lookalike cast for the episode, Amjad J. Qaisen, could not speak intelligibly enough for television production purposes, so the voice of "Hussein" was added in post-production by Seinfeld co-creator Larry David.

References

External links 
 

Seinfeld (season 5) episodes
1994 American television episodes
Television episodes written by Larry David